Abdullah Abu Dahesh (Arabic:عبدالله أبوداهش)  is a Saudi historian and researcher, born in Tanomah Bani Shehr in Asir province in 1950. He was highly interested in the historical literature of the southern Saudi Arabia Kingdom. He established the magazine Habaasha, which is a scientific yearbook magazine specialized in studies of the history and literature of the Arabian Peninsula and its intellectual heritage. He has many publications that vary from authoring to investigating Arab heritage.

Education 
He had a doctorate degree with first honours from the Faculty of Arabic Language at Imam Muhammad Ibn Saud Islamic University in 1984, and his thesis was on (The Impact of Sheikh Muhammad ibn Abd al-Wahhab's Call on Thought and Literature in Southern Arabic pensualia).

Career 

 He worked as a professor of literature at King Khalid University in Abha.
 He founded Habaasha magazine, an annual scientific magazine specialized in scientific research in studies of the Arabic peninsula's literature, history and intellectual heritage. The first issue of it was published in 2011.
 He established Dr. Abdullah Abu Dahish house for Scientific research and publishing, and Dr. Abdullah Abu Dahish prize for scientific research.

Works

Author 

 (Athar Dawa Alshiekh Mohammad bin Abd Alwahaab fi Alfikir wa Al-Adab bi Janoobay Ajazeerah AlArabia) part one. Issued in King Abdul-Aziz house in 1999
 (Ahl AlSuraat Fi AlQuroon Al-Eslamia Al-Waseeta)
 (Buyootat Al-Elm Wa Tullabah Biqabaahil Rijaal Alhajar fi Baadh Alwathaek wa Almakhtootaat Al-mahallia )
 (Alharakah Alelmiyah wa Aladabia bi Mantikat Asir fi Ahd Almalik Abdul-Aziz)
 (Alhayaah Alfikriya wa Aladabiya fi Janoob Albilaad Alsaudiya)
 (Hayaah fi Hayaah)
 (Al-Rajaz fi Alsaheehayn)
 (Shuwaraa Hawla Al-Rasool Salla Allah Alayh Wa Sallam)
 ( Al-Sher Fi Saheeh Al-Bukhaari Wa Muslim)
 (Min Bawakeer Al-Sher Alsiyaasi Al-Hadeeth fi Jazeerat Al-Arab)
 (Nahwa Manhaj Adabi Islami)

Researcher 

 (Alqaseedataan Aldhaleetan Almansoobatan Ela Al-Ameer Al-Sanaani)
 (Allijam Almakeen Wa Al-Zimam Al-Mateen) By Muhammad bin Ahmad Al-Hafizi
 (Al-Mafqood min Sher Ali bin Muhammad Al-Sinwisi) collection and investigation
 (Naseehat Al-Hafizi) Ahmed bin Abdul-Qadir Al-Hafizi.
 (Baeeyat Al-Thurwe fi Mizan Al-Nakd).

Awards 
He won King Salman prize and scholarship for the History of the Arabian Peninsula for Pioneers in the History of the Arabian Peninsula in 2005.

References 

Saudi Arabian historians
Living people
1950 births
People from 'Asir Province